University Academy Holbeach is a co-educational secondary school and sixth form located in Holbeach, Lincolnshire, England.

The school was established in 2011 following the closure of The St Guthlac's School in Crowland and George Farmer Technology and Language College in Holbeach (formerly named George Farmer Secondary School). It was created as an academy with the sponsorship of the University of Lincoln which already runs its National Centre for Food Manufacturing directly next to the campus site of the former George Farmer Technology and Language College in Holbeach. The new school building was completed on the old George Farmer site on 4 November 2013.

In 2014 UAH became part of the Lincolnshire Educational Trust MAT along with Holbeach Primary Academy (2015) and Gosberton House Academy (2016). The Chair of the LET was Professor J Scott Davidson of the University of Lincoln and the CEO was Andrew Breckon. In 2019 The Peele Community College in Long Sutton became University Academy Long Sutton which is linked with UAH.

References

External links
 University Academy Holbeach
 The St Guthlacs School

Academies in Lincolnshire
Secondary schools in Lincolnshire
Educational institutions established in 2011
2011 establishments in England
Holbeach